Per Erik F. "Pågen" Ohlsson (20 November 1884 – 19 September 1980) was a Swedish sport shooter who competed in the 1908 Summer Olympics, in the 1912 Summer Olympics, and in the 1920 Summer Olympics.

In 1908 he finished 28th in the 300 metre free rifle competition and 43rd in the 1000 yard free rifle event. Four years later he finished 21st in the 300 metre military rifle, three positions competition and 28th in the 600 metre free rifle event. In 1920 he won the silver medal as member of the Swedish team in the team small-bore rifle competition and the bronze medal in the team 600 metre military rifle, prone.

In the 1920 Summer Olympics he also participated in the following events:

 600 metre military rifle, prone - eighth place
 300 metre military rifle, prone - place unknown
 50 metre small-bore rifle - place unknown

References

External links
profile

1884 births
1980 deaths
Swedish male sport shooters
ISSF rifle shooters
Olympic shooters of Sweden
Shooters at the 1908 Summer Olympics
Shooters at the 1912 Summer Olympics
Shooters at the 1920 Summer Olympics
Olympic silver medalists for Sweden
Olympic bronze medalists for Sweden
Olympic medalists in shooting
Medalists at the 1920 Summer Olympics
Sportspeople from Malmö
19th-century Swedish people
20th-century Swedish people